Zwelisha  is a rural settlement in Mbombela Local Municipality in Ehlanzeni District of the Mpumalanga province, South Africa.

Demography
During the national census of 2011 the 4.58 km2 village housed an estimated 12,636 inhabitants, of which 99,7% were Black South Africans with 92% speaking Seswati as their home language.

References

Populated places in the Mbombela Local Municipality